Armenian Brazilians are Brazilian persons who are fully, partially, or predominantly of Armenian descent, or Armenian immigrants in Brazil.

Migration history

Armenian immigrants in Brazil gathered mostly in and around the city of São Paulo, where there are churches, cultural centers, and even a metro station named "Armênia". The Armenian community maintains a strong presence in the city, albeit not in the country as a whole.

Armenians in Latin America arranged a demonstration in Brazil, in the city of São Paulo at the Armenian genocide monument on 24 April 1965 of the 50th Anniversary of putting into force the Law of Relocation, and a play titled "The Adventures of Armenians 1915" was written and performed by Armenians of Brazil at a theatre in São Paulo.

Notable Armenian Brazilians
 Aracy Balabanian – actress;
 Comendador Levy Gasparian – businessman;
 Ricardo Tacuchian – composer and conductor;
 Pedro Pedrossian – politician and civil engineer;
 Fiuk (Filipe Kartalian) – singer, composer, actor and model;
 Stepan Nercessian – actor and politician;
 Antonio Kandir – mechanical and production engineer, economist, university teacher and politician; 
 Daniel Sarafian – MMA fighter;
 Ricardo Tacuchian – composer;
 Marcelo Djian – former soccer player;
 Sergio Kafejian – composer; 
 Fábio Mahseredjian – personal trainer; 
 Vahan Agopyan – civil engineer and rector of University of São Paulo;
 Krikor Mekhitarian – chess player;
 Marcos Pizzelli – professional soccer player;
 Mihran Latif-Latifyan – engineer; 
 Fernando Gasparian – politician;

See also
 Armenia–Brazil relations
 Armenian diaspora
 Immigration to Brazil

References

Further reading

External links
Website of Armenian Community in Brazil - Pari Yegadzek
 Tigran Ghanalanyan, Armenian Protestant communities in South America, http://noravank.am/eng/issues/detail.php?ELEMENT_ID=5722

Ethnic groups in Brazil
Brazil
 
Armenia–Brazil relations